{{DISPLAYTITLE:C3H4O}}

C3H4O is a chemical formula that represents each of several actual and hypothetical compounds that differ in structure, but each consist of three atoms of carbon, four of hydrogen, and one of oxygen. The following compounds are among them:

 Epoxypropene or methyl-oxirene, cyclo(-C(CH3)=CH-O-),  not synthesized
 Oxetene, cyclo(-CH=CH-O-CH2-),  not synthesized

The following additional such compounds are discussed in an order that facilitates reference to the accompanying structural graphic:
 Top half of diagram
 Left column of top half
 (The top and second rows of the left column form a unit connected by opposed arrows.)
 (top row) Acrolein or 2-propenal, H2C=CH-CHO, CAS number 
 (2nd row) (The diagram and CAS number 81788-96-7 match 1,2-propadien-1-ol.)
 Center column of top half
 (top row) Propargyl alcohol or 2-propyn-1-ol, HC≡C-CH2OH, CAS number 
 (2nd row) Methoxy ethyne or methyl ethynyl ether, HC≡COCH3, CAS number 
 Right column of top half
 (top row) 1-Propynol, CH3C≡C-OH, CAS number 
 (2nd row) Methyl ketene or 1-propen-1-one, O=C=CH-CH3, CAS number 
 Bottom half of diagram
 Third row
 (Left column of 3rd row) Methylene oxirane, cyclo [-CH2-O-C(=CH2)-], CAS number  
 (The center and right columns of the 3rd rows form a unit connected by opposed arrows.)
 (Center column of 3rd row) Cyclopropanone, cyclo (-CH2-CH2-CO-), CAS number 
 (Right column of 3rd row) The name 1-Cyclopropen-1-ol is used for CAS 81788-95-6.
 (1-Cyclopropenol or 1-hydroxy-cyclopropene, cyclo (-CH=COH-CH2-), tautomer of cyclopropanone,  not synthesized, is a  C3H4O compound.)
 Fourth row
 (Left column of 4th row) (A diagram apparently equivalent to the 81788-94-5 one in the diagram has been published with the second of the following names:) 2-Cyclopropenol or 1-hydroxy-2-cyclopropene, cyclo (-CH=CH-CHOH-), not synthesized
 (Second column of 4th row) 1,2-Epoxypropene or 2-methyloxirene, CAS number 
 (Third column of 4th row) 2H-Oxete bears CAS number 
 (Right column of 4th row) 2-Oxabicyclo[1.1.0]butane, CAS number